Pokémon, known in Japan as , is a Japanese anime television series produced by animation studio OLM for TV Tokyo. It is adapted from the Pokémon video game series published by Nintendo. The series follows the Pokémon trainer and aspiring Pokémon master Ash Ketchum and his adventures with his electric mouse partner Pikachu (voiced by Ikue Ōtani), and a varying group of friends.

The division between seasons of Pokémon is based on the Japanese version openings of each episode and reflect the actual production season. The English episode numbers are based on their final airing either in syndication, on The WB, Cartoon Network, Disney XD or Netflix. Subsequent episodes of the English version follow the original Japanese order, except where banned episodes are shown.

Episode list

Season 14: Black & White (2010–11)

Season 15: Black & White: Rival Destinies (2011–12)

Season 16: Black & White: Adventures in Unova and Beyond (2012–13)

Season 17: XY (2013–14)

Season 18: XY: Kalos Quest (2014–15)

Season 19: XYZ (2015–16)

Season 20: Sun & Moon (2016–17)

Season 21: Sun & Moon - Ultra Adventures (2017–18)

Season 22: Sun & Moon - Ultra Legends (2018–19)

Season 23: Journeys (2019–20)

Season 24: Master Journeys (2020–21)

Season 25: Ultimate Journeys (2021–present)

Notes

References

External links
 
 
 
 

Pokémon seasons 14-present
episodes seasons 14-present
Pokémon episodes